Turovets is a rural locality (a settlement) and the administrative center Turovetskoye Rural Settlement, Mezhdurechensky District, Vologda Oblast, Russia. The population was 1,027 as of 2002.

Geography 
Turovets is located 243 km northeast of Shuyskoye (the district's administrative centre) by road. Uvarovitsa is the nearest rural locality.

References 

Rural localities in Mezhdurechensky District, Vologda Oblast